In Greek mythology, Anius (Ancient Greek: Ἄνιος) was a king of Delos and priest of Apollo.

Family 
He was the son of Apollo and Rhoeo, daughter of Staphylus and Chrysothemis.

Mythology 
Anius was born either on the island of Delos, which was sacred to his father Apollo, or on Euboea, after the box in which his mother had been placed by Staphylus when he had discovered her pregnancy was washed ashore there. Rhoeo then, placing the baby on Apollo's altar, asked the god to care for it, if it was his. Rhoeo then married Zarex, who thus became the legal father of Anius. Apollo cared for the child Anius for a long time, teaching him the arts of divination and prophecy. Anius later became Apollo's priest and the king of Delos.

Anius had three daughters: Oeno, Spermo, and Elais, known as the Oenotropae; and three sons, Andros, Mykonos, and Thasos. Their mother was Dorippe, a Thracian woman ransomed by Anius for the price of a horse from the pirates who had kidnapped her. Dionysus gave the three daughters the power to change whatever they wanted into wine, wheat, and oil. When the Greeks landed on Delos while on their way to Troy, Anius prophesied that the Trojan War would not be won until the tenth year, and insisted that they stay with him for nine years, promising that his daughters would supply them with aliments during that period. When Agamemnon heard this, he wanted to take the Oenotropae with him by force, to provide his army with food and wine. They prayed to Dionysus, who changed them into doves.

Of Anius's three sons, Andros and Mykonos became eponyms of the islands of Andros and Mykonos respectively. As for Thasos, he was devoured by dogs, and since then it was prohibited to keep dogs on Delos.

Later, Anius, an old friend of Anchises, gave aid to him, his son Aeneas, and his retinue when they were fleeing from Troy and en route to the future site of Rome. According to a rare version of the myth, Aeneas married Anius's daughter Lavinia (or Launa), who, like her father, had prophetic abilities and bore Aeneas a son, who was also named Anius.

Notes

References 

 Diodorus Siculus, The Library of History translated by Charles Henry Oldfather. Twelve volumes. Loeb Classical Library. Cambridge, Massachusetts: Harvard University Press; London: William Heinemann, Ltd. 1989. Vol. 3. Books 4.59–8. Online version at Bill Thayer's Web Site
 Diodorus Siculus, Bibliotheca Historica. Vol 1-2. Immanel Bekker. Ludwig Dindorf. Friedrich Vogel. in aedibus B. G. Teubneri. Leipzig. 1888–1890. Greek text available at the Perseus Digital Library.
 Dionysus of Halicarnassus, Roman Antiquities. English translation by Earnest Cary in the Loeb Classical Library, 7 volumes. Harvard University Press, 1937–1950. Online version at Bill Thayer's Web Site
 Dionysius of Halicarnassus, Antiquitatum Romanarum quae supersunt, Vol I-IV. . Karl Jacoby. In Aedibus B.G. Teubneri. Leipzig. 1885. Greek text available at the Perseus Digital Library.
 Gaius Julius Hyginus, Fabulae from The Myths of Hyginus translated and edited by Mary Grant. University of Kansas Publications in Humanistic Studies. Online version at the Topos Text Project.
 Maurus Servius Honoratus, In Vergilii carmina comentarii. Servii Grammatici qui feruntur in Vergilii carmina commentarii; recensuerunt Georgius Thilo et Hermannus Hagen. Georgius Thilo. Leipzig. B. G. Teubner. 1881. Online version at the Perseus Digital Library.
 Pseudo-Apollodorus, The Library with an English Translation by Sir James George Frazer, F.B.A., F.R.S. in 2 Volumes, Cambridge, MA, Harvard University Press; London, William Heinemann Ltd. 1921. Online version at the Perseus Digital Library. Greek text available from the same website.
 Publius Ovidius Naso, Ibis translated by A. S. Kline © 2003. Online version at the Poetry in Translation
 Publius Ovidius Naso, Ibis. R. Merkelii Recognitione, Vol III. Rudolf Merkel. Rudolf Ehwald. Lipsiae. In Aedibus B.G. Teubneri. 1889. Latin text available at the Perseus Digital Library.
 Publius Ovidius Naso, Metamorphoses translated by Brookes More (1859-1942). Boston, Cornhill Publishing Co. 1922. Online version at the Perseus Digital Library.
 Publius Ovidius Naso, Metamorphoses. Hugo Magnus. Gotha (Germany). Friedr. Andr. Perthes. 1892. Latin text available at the Perseus Digital Library.
 Stephanus of Byzantium, Stephani Byzantii Ethnicorum quae supersunt, edited by August Meineike (1790-1870), published 1849. A few entries from this important ancient handbook of place names have been translated by Brady Kiesling. Online version at the Topos Text Project.

Mythological Greek seers
Kings in Greek mythology
Children of Apollo
Characters in the Aeneid
Metamorphoses characters
Ancient Delos